The ranks and rank insignia of the Soviet Armed Forces between 1955 and 1991 were distinguished by the reorganisation of the Soviet armed forces after the death of Stalin, resulting in changes to ranks, insignia, and uniforms.

Changes to distinction insignia

Shoulder straps to field utilization 
In December 1956 the coloured border piping on officers' shoulder straps was changed. A cinnamon-brown color was used instead of the burgundy red previously worn by commanders and commanding officers. All other officers and other ranks wore corps colours as follows:
 Motorised & mechanised rifles – raspberry
 Artillery & armored troops – black, red
 Air Force & aviation  – blue
 Technical troops of any kind and the navy – black

The regimental numberings of the 1943 system were removed altogether.

Enlisted men, non-commissioned officers, warrant officers, and michman

Army, Air Force 

Colors by type of troops:
 motorized infantry troops – red (scarlet);
 artillery, rocket, tank, engineering, construction, automobile, railway troops, signal-corps, troops of radiation, chemical and biological protection – black;
 air force and airborne troops – sky blue;
 state security troops (KGB troops) – dark blue, instead of the letters "СА" the letters "" ( – State Security);
 internal troops (Interior Ministry troops) – crimson (dark red), instead of the letters "СА" the letters "";
 border troops – green, instead of the letters "" the letters "".

Ratings of the Navy, coastal services and other shore commands

Letter codes from 1972 onward 
 The letter imprint on Soviet navy shoulder boards symbolised the adherence to the appropriate fleet or naval major command.
 – Fleet, general personnel of the Navy
 – Baltic Fleet
 – Black Sea Fleet
 – Northern Fleet
 – Pacific Fleet
 Other letter symbols
 – – Internal Troops
 – – students of military musician schools or cadets of military bands
 – – armed forces (Soviet Army, later USSR armed forces, also Armed forces of the USSR)
 – – Committee for State Security (KGB)
 – – higher military college student
 – – cadet in the  Nakhimov Naval School
 – – border troops
 – – special school
 – – cadet at a Suvorov Military School

Army officers and generals (all services)

Naval officers and flag officers (all services)

Top ranks

See also 
 History of Russian military ranks
 Ranks and insignia of the Imperial Russian Armed Forces
 Military ranks of the Soviet Union (1918–1935)
 Military ranks of the Soviet Union (1935–1940)
 Military ranks of the Soviet Union (1940–1943)
 Military ranks of the Soviet Union (1943–1955)
 Ranks and rank insignia of the Russian Federation´s armed forces 1994–2010

References

Bibliography
 
 

Russian Federation Army
Military ranks of the Soviet Union